The European Forum for Good Clinical Practices (EFGCP) is a European think tank which works on the ethical, regulatory, and scientific framework of clinical research in Europe. The EFGCP is committed to the development of the standards for the protection of human subjects and data quality in clinical trials, both in Europe and abroad.

See also 
 European Clinical Research Infrastructures Network (ECRIN)
 European Medicines Agency (EMEA, EU)
 European and Developing Countries Clinical Trials Partnership (EDCTP)
 EUDRANET
 EudraVigilance
 Good Clinical Practice (GCP)
 Harmonization in clinical trials
 International Conference on Harmonisation of Technical Requirements for Registration of Pharmaceuticals for Human Use (ICH)
 Inverse benefit law
 Quality assurance
 Standing operating procedure

External links 
 European Forum for Good Clinical Practices

European clinical research
Clinical trials
European medical and health organizations
Pharmaceutical industry
National agencies for drug regulation
International organisations based in Belgium